David Dillon may refer to:

David Dillon (businessman) (born 1951), American businessman
David Dillon (journalist), British journalist